Bogadi Road is a cluster of villages in Mysuru Metropoltian area , ಮೈಸೂರು ಜಿಲ್ಲೆ , ಕರ್ನಾಟಕ of India

Location
Bogadi road begins from Bhogadi in western Mysore and ends at Hampapura on the Mananthavady road.  The total distance of this road is 31.4 km.

Access
Bogadi road begins from Mysore city and passes through the SBI Bank Bogadi, Ring Road junction , Bhogadi village, Dasanakoppallu, Trends Whispering Woods, Shankar farm, Suvarna nagara, Yesh Nagar and Krishna Farm.  The first part of the road is dominated by commercial building, housing colonies and posh schools.  Villages like Kaniyan Hundigate, Muthayyana hundi, G.B.Circle, Gollana Beedu and Shintana Halli lead you to Alanahalli town. After Alnahalli junction, there are more villages like Gangadhosalli, Aswalu and Gejjeyana Hoddaragudi.  The road proceeds further through Karibudhana Halli village and finally reaches at the temple town of Kendaganna Swamy Gaddige.  Mananthavady road is another 10 km from here.

Education
There are many prestigious public schools in this area like Christ Public School, Rainbow School, St. Francis School, Pundits Orchid School and Jawahar Navodaya School. SCMS Higher Primary school is one of the government schools in this area.

Villages and suburbs
Bogadi, Ganagara hundi, Jattihundi, Beerihundi, Alanahalli, Kyathanahalli, Gollanabeedu, Aswalu and Kumarabeedu are the main villages in this area.

Image gallery

See also
 
 Gaddige Kenddganeshwara
 Hampapura, Mysore

References

Villages in Mysore district